The Special Administrative Unit of Solidarity Organizations is the Colombian Executive Administrative Department in charge of directing and coordinating government policy to promote, plan, protect, strengthen, and develop the organizations of social economy in order to improve the quality of life of the Colombian people.

References

Government agencies established in 2011
Ministry of Labour (Colombia)